Heonjong of Goryeo (1 August 1084 – 6 November 1097) (r. 1094–1095) was the fourteenth monarch of the Goryeo dynasty of Korea. He was the eldest son of king Seonjong. According to the Goryeosa, he was a bright child and excelled in writing by the age of 9.

In the year of his accession, Heonjong was faced by the rebellion of Yi Ja-ui, which was quickly put down. In the following year, he fell ill and gave up the throne to king Sukjong, his uncle.

Family 

 Father: Munjong of Goryeo (고려 문종)
 Grandfather: Hyeonjong of Goryeo (고려 현종)
 Grandmother: Queen Wonhye (원혜왕후)
 Mother: Queen Inye (인예왕후)
 Grandfather: Yi Ja-yeon
 Grandmother: Lady, of the Gyeongju Gim clan

See also
List of Korean monarchs
Goryeo
History of Korea

References

 

1084 births
1097 deaths
11th-century Korean monarchs
People from Kaesong